St Erth Praze is a hamlet in west Cornwall, England, United Kingdom. It is on the B3302 road east of St Erth/

References

Hamlets in Cornwall